Kyle Dean Denney (born July 27, 1977) is a former Major League Baseball pitcher.

Drafted in the 26th round of the 1999 Major League Baseball Draft by the Cleveland Indians, Denney worked his way through the Indians' minor league organization, being named a  Eastern League All-Star. He made his major league debut on September 14, 2004. He became a free agent after the  season and signed with the Washington Nationals on February 10, starting six games for their Triple-A New Orleans team. In , Denney played five games for the Single-A Lakeland Tigers of the Detroit Tigers organization.

In September 2004, while riding the team bus after a game in Kansas City, Denney was struck in the calf by a stray bullet fired by an unknown assailant. He was saved from suffering a more serious injury thanks to the pair of USC cheerleader boots he was wearing as part of a hazing ritual.

Denney was also an excellent high school quarterback and basketball guard.

References

External links

Indians' pitcher shot on team bus

1977 births
Living people
People from Prague, Oklahoma
Baseball players from Oklahoma
Major League Baseball pitchers
Akron Aeros players
Cleveland Indians players
Buffalo Bisons (minor league) players
Kinston Indians players
Mahoning Valley Scrappers players
New Orleans Zephyrs players
Lakeland Tigers players
Oklahoma Sooners baseball players
American shooting survivors
Burlington Indians players (1986–2006)
Columbus Red Stixx players